Racing Stripes is a 2005 American sports comedy family film directed by Frederik Du Chau. The film was produced by Andrew A. Kosove, Broderick Johnson, Lloyd Phillips and Edward L. McDonnell, based on a script written by David Schmidt, Steven P. Wegner, Kirk DeMicco, and Du Chau. It was released theatrically on January 14, 2005, by Warner Bros.

The film tells the story of Stripes, a circus plains zebra who is accidentally abandoned in Kentucky and raised on a farm next to a racing track. Believing he is a racehorse, Stripes dreams of training for and competing in the races. The film stars Hayden Panettiere, Bruce Greenwood, Wendie Malick and M. Emmet Walsh, with the vocal and voice talents of Frankie Muniz, Mandy Moore, Michael Clarke Duncan, Jeff Foxworthy, Joshua Jackson, Joe Pantoliano, Michael Rosenbaum, Steve Harvey, David Spade, Snoop Dogg, Fred Dalton Thompson, Dustin Hoffman and Whoopi Goldberg.

The film received mixed to negative reviews from critics and it earned $90 million. Racing Stripes was released on DVD and VHS on May 10, 2005, by Warner Home Video.

Plot
During a thunderstorm, a traveling circus, Circus Sarano, accidentally leaves behind a baby plains zebra (Jansen Panettiere) after replacing a flat tire. The foal is rescued by widower and former racehorse trainer Nolan Walsh (Bruce Greenwood), and is taken to his farm where his 13-year-old daughter, Channing (Hayden Panettiere) names him Stripes. He meets a Shetland pony named Tucker (Dustin Hoffman); a Saanen goat named Franny (Whoopi Goldberg); and a rooster named Reggie (Jeff Foxworthy). The next day, Stripes soon becomes convinced that he is destined for the nearby racetrack, Turfway Park, not realizing that he is not a horse, but a zebra and is disqualified to race. Two foals named Trenton's Pride (Kyle Alcazar) and Ruffshodd (Frankie Ryan Manriquez) decide to race Stripes until they are stopped by Pride's father, three time Kentucky Open champion, Sir Trenton (Fred Dalton Thompson).

Three years later, after racing the mailman again, an adult Stripes (Frankie Muniz) meets an Arabian filly named Sandy (Mandy Moore) and develops a crush on her after losing to the mailman in their usual race. While talking to Sandy, he is approached by Pride (Joshua Jackson) and Ruffshodd (Michael Rosenbaum), Stripes' tormentors since childhood while Channing's bloodhound, Lightning (Snoop Dogg) is lazy and talks while he rests. Pride challenges Stripes to a racing match at a secret racetrack in the woods called the Blue Moon Races; he accepts, but loses the race.

The following day, Tucker, having secretly watched Stripes, approaches him and suggests that he gets proper training first. Stripes, in need of a rider, chooses 16-year-old Channing and convinces a new farm animal, a pelican named Goose (Joe Pantoliano), to sabotage Channing's motorcycle and Old Blue, Nolan's old pickup truck, so that Channing can ride him to her workplace at Turfway Park. The plan works, and Channing, with Nolan's reluctant approval, rides Stripes to Turfway Park. There, Channing is antagonized by her boss, Clara Dalrymple (Wendie Malick), for bringing Stripes to the racetrack, while Stripes meets a pair of horse-fly brothers, Buzz and Scuzz (Steve Harvey and David Spade).

As night approaches, Channing, remembering her first ride on horseback with her mother, Carolyn, completes a lap around the track with Stripes. They are approached by Woodzie (M. Emmet Walsh), a racetrack gambler and old friend of the family, who encourages Channing to sign her and Stripes up for a tryout race tomorrow. She does, despite Nolan's disapproval stemming from his wife's death in a racing accident six years ago, which discouraged him to continue training horses ever since, but Stripes has a major meltdown after being easily scared by the horse-gate like all the other horses the next morning at the tryouts. Once he calms down, he begins running, but then gets hit in the face by flying dirt while racing, causing Channing to fall off. Though she is uninjured, Nolan chastises and blames her. However, when Dalrymple mocks her riding skills, Nolan defends his daughter. In response, Dalrymple sarcastically signs Stripes up to compete in the Kentucky Open competition.

Meanwhile, Stripes realizes he is a zebra after being told off by Sir Trenton, which severely discourages him. Despite Channing's pleas and Woodzie's encouragement, Nolan refuses to let her race Stripes. Realizing this, the farm animals lure Nolan into the farm to show him a table holding his past accomplishments, and he changes his mind. Meanwhile, due to Stripes' misbehavior during training, Franny reveals to Stripes that Tucker helped Nolan train the racehorse champions including Sir Trenton without getting any thanks, which encourages him to begin training.

Refusing to allow Stripes to race, Sir Trenton and his thugs ambush Stripes and Sandy at a creek as they are talking and making up for their previous argument one night, kidnapping Sandy and threatening to hurt her if he races. The next day, after rescuing Stripes, who was injured by Sir Trenton's goons, Tucker, Franny, and Goose agree to rescue Sandy. With a little help from Buzz and Scuzz, the rescue is successful, and they get back in time for Stripes to go to the race.

At the race, Nolan bets Dalrymple that if Stripes wins, then he gets Sandy, and if he loses, then he will come back to work for her. During the race, Ruffshodd, and even his jockey, try to stop Stripes from winning until Scuzz gets them disqualified by biting Ruffshodd's rear-end. Later, Stripes begins to wear out until he finally remembers what Tucker taught him, "Don't look back. Leave it all on the track," which boosts his confidence. Stripes wins the race and earns respect from the other racehorses, including Pride. In the end, they all pose together in a group photo, which is later shown with the other previous Walsh wins.

Cast

Humans
 Hayden Panettiere as Channing "Chan" Walsh, who is Nolan's beautiful free-spirited 16-year-old daughter who is determined and willing to ride on horseback on Stripes, and despite her lack of opportunity, she has a natural talent for it exactly like her late mother, Carolyn, who died in a horse racing accident at Turfway Park when she was 10 six years ago.
 Bruce Greenwood as Nolan "The Chief" Walsh, who is Channing's widowed father, a veteran Kentucky corn farmer, and a retired racehorse trainer who has not been able to bear training horses, let alone Stripes the prized zebra, ever since his late wife, Carolyn, was killed when her racehorse stumbled six years ago when his daughter, Channing, was only 10 years old. Fearing that Channing will hurt herself if she ever rides Stripes, he refuses to let her anywhere near a saddle or the Turfway Park racetrack until at almost the end of the movie, where he finally wants to help Channing and Stripes for the big race, the Kentucky Open (an implied spoof of the Kentucky Derby), and finally encourages them to enter in it and win, which they do in the end.
 M. Emmet Walsh as Sheriff Woodzie, who is an old, wide racetrack gambler and a good friend to the Walsh family. He sympathizes with Channing, especially since he sees the same gift in her that was present in her late mother, Carolyn.
 Wendie Malick as Clara Dalrymple, who is Nolan's former employer, Channing's boss, and, while beautiful, the film's main villain. She admires Trenton's Pride and Ruffshodd and only sees the Kentucky Open competition as a means of business and money and is not concerned for the well-being of her horses, especially not Stripes.
 Gary Bullock as John Cooper, who is one of the racehorse trainers for the Kentucky Open thoroughbred sweepstakes. He doesn't share his boss, Dalrymple's views on pushing her horses past their limits, but continues to follow her instructions in order to get his paychecks, which are important for his work.
 Caspar Poyck as The Mailman, who Stripes is beaten by every morning after they race around the block.

Voice actors
 Frankie Muniz as Stripes, a foundling zebra who desires to compete in the Kentucky Open race, which leads to bullying from the local horses with the sole exception of Sandy, whom he has a crush on. His younger self was voiced by Jansen Panettiere, Hayden Panettiere's brother.
 Dustin Hoffman as Tucker, a Shetland pony who used to help Nolan train racehorses, including Sir Trenton. He presents himself with a grumpy demeanor after years of training ungrateful horses before retiring. But then helps Stripes by teaching him to race, Stripes was the only one who was really grateful to him for his help.
 Whoopi Goldberg as Franny, an elderly Saanen goat who constantly encourages Stripes to pursue his dream and gives him many words of advice. She seems to be the only animal on the farm aware of how upset Tucker is about his retirement.
 Mandy Moore as Sandy, a professional jumper Arabian filly. She is the only horse who supports Stripes' dream to become a racehorse. She and Stripes have romantic feelings for each other, which become mutual by the end of the film. After Stripes wins, she ends up living at the farm as part of Nolan and Dalrymple's bet.
 Steve Harvey and David Spade as Buzz and Scuzz, a pair of horsefly brothers who serve as the film's comic relief and are good friends with Tucker. Buzz is larger and has blue eyes and combed hair, while Scuzz is scrawnier and has red eyes and messed-up hair. The brothers have a different taste in music: Scuzz is a rap fan while Buzz favors classical music.
 Jeff Foxworthy as Reggie, the Walsh farm's rooster, who means well, but is not very bright. He serves as the news announcer for the rest of the farm animals.
 Joe Pantoliano as Goose, a New York-accented American white pelican from the big city. He states that he moved to the farm in order to escape several other birds who have placed a hit on him, and that he was a "hit bird". It is presumably his experiences that render him afraid of loud noises.
 Snoop Dogg as Lightning, the family's lazy Bloodhound who talks while asleep.
 Fred Thompson as Sir Trenton, an arrogant black Thoroughbred horse who sees his son, Trenton's Pride, as having no purpose other than to carry on the Trenton legacy. He also seems to view the Kentucky Open competition as his property, which leads to his antagonistic nature towards Stripes, whom he believes might ruin it. He is also one of Tucker's former racehorses-in-training before Nolan and Tucker retired from training.
 Joshua Jackson as Trenton's Pride, Sir Trenton's son, who is a bully and picks on Stripes every chance he gets but still believes in winning a race the fair and honest way unlike his father and other horses. However, by the end of the film, he makes up and becomes friends with Stripes, having become impressed with his racing ability. His younger self was voiced by Kyle Alcazar.
 Michael Rosenbaum as Ruffshodd, Pride's friend and lackey. At first, it seems that he bullies Stripes with Pride merely out of sycophancy for the latter and fear of Pride's father, but in reality, he is a worse bully by far, proving quite eager to help Sir Trenton in threatening Sandy in order to keep Stripes from racing in the Kentucky Open. This is further evidenced when he and his rider persistently try to sabotage Stripes during the Kentucky Open competition. His younger self was voiced by Frankie Ryan Manriquez.
 Michael Clarke Duncan as Clydesdale, a Clydesdale horse who oversees the Bluemoon races.

Additional voices
 Philip Proctor
 Mona Marshall
 Chris Edgerly
 Dee Bradley Baker
 Jess Harnell
 Robert Clotworthy
 Paul Pape
 Eddie Frierson
 Jason Harris Katz
 Randall Montgomery
 Anne Lockhart
 Bob Neill
 Jason Harris
 Claudette Wells

Production

On September 10, 2002, it was announced that Frederik Du Chau was hired and set to direct Racing Stripes. David Schmidt, Steven P. Wegner and Kirk DeMicco wrote the script for the film. Andrew Kosove, Broderick Johnson, Lloyd Phillips and Edward L. McDonnell produced the film with the budget of $30 million for release in 2005. On 22 November, it was announced that Bruce Greenwood, Hayden Panettiere, M. Emmet Walsh, Wendie Malick, Gary Bullock, Frankie Muniz, Dustin Hoffman, Whoopi Goldberg, Mandy Moore, Jeff Foxworthy, Joe Pantoliano, Fred Dalton Thompson, Joshua Jackson, Michael Rosenbaum, Snoop Dogg, Michael Clarke Duncan, Steve Harvey, and David Spade joined the film. On March 25, 2003, it was announced that Mark Isham would compose the music for the film.

Two racing zebras, Sam and Daisy, were used in the film. Sam was more well-behaved, and "kind of wanted to be a horse," according to Tim Rivers, who trained him at the Animals in Motion farm near Citra, Florida. Sam had experience in Ace Ventura: When Nature Calls, Second Noah and Sheena.

During production of the film, Hayden Panettiere was thrown off a zebra and ended up hospitalized with a concussion and a pinched nerve in her neck. The producers forbade her from mentioning the injury during publicity for the film; she finally revealed it during a 2013 episode of British talk show The Graham Norton Show.

Casting
In March 2003, Frankie Muniz was cast following his performance on Agent Cody Banks. On July 27, 2003, another cast was announced, such as Hayden Panettiere, who will star opposite the voices of Dustin Hoffman, Whoopi Goldberg, Joe Pantoliano, Mandy Moore, and Patrick Stewart.

Also joining the cast of voices is Joshua Jackson, Michael Rosenbaum, Steve Harvey, David Spade, Michael Clarke Duncan and Jeff Foxworthy. In August, Bruce Greenwood was cast in the film.

Patrick Stewart was originally going to voice Sir Trenton.

Filming
It was filmed at the Hollywoodbets Scottsville Racecourse in Pietermaritzburg, South Africa and Riverholm Country Estate in Nottingham Road, South Africa. Development of the film was completed in Los Angeles, California. On May 21, Summit Entertainment and Warner Bros. acquired distribution rights to the film.

Soundtrack
The film's score was composed by Mark Isham, who also produced and co-wrote "Taking the Inside Rail" with Sting; "It Ain't Over Yet," heard with Channing and Nolan train Stripes and at the end of the film, was written by Bryan Adams, Gretchen Peters and Eliot Kennedy and produced by Adams. The soundtrack album was released on January 11, 2005, on the Varèse Sarabande label.
 Taking the Inside Rail - Sting
 It Was a Dark and Stormy Night
 At Home on Walsh Farm
 I'm a Racehorse!
 The Blue Moon Races
 A Pelican Named Goose
 Tucker Lays It Out!
 Goose Makes a Hit on the Iron Horse
 Run Like the Wind
 Twilight Run
 Upstaged by a Zebra
 A Brave Decision
 Glory Days
 If You Build It, They Will Come
 Out of Africa
 Spring Training
 Ambushed!
 Filly in Distress
 Race Day
 They're All In!
 The Big Race
 In The Winner's Circle
 It Ain't Over Yet - Bryan Adams
 The Good, The Bad and The Ugly – Ennio Morricone
 My Girl – Steve Harvey
 U Can't Touch This – David Spade
 Here Comes The Hotstepper - David Spade
 Ebony and Ivory - Steve Harvey and David Spade
 Overture, from 'Le nozze di Figaro (The Marriage of Figaro)' K.492 - Hungarian State Orchestra
 Exsultate, jubillate, K.165 - Kosice Teachers' Choir/Camerata Cassovia
 Walk This Way - Run-D.M.C.
 The National Anthem USA
 Who Let The Dogs Out? - Steve Harvey and David Spade

Reception

Box office
The film was a modest success at the box office, having covered its budget. It grossed $49,000,000 at the American box office and an additional $40,000,000 at the international box office.

Critical response
Critical reaction to the film was mixed to negative, with the movie scoring 35% on Rotten Tomatoes, based on 98 reviews. The site's consensus reads: "Racing Stripes might be good for a few laps with younger viewers, but it's too blandly predictable to truly recommend for an all-ages audience." On Metacritic, the film has a score of 43 out of 100, based on 26 critics, indicating "mixed or average" reviews.

Audiences polled by CinemaScore gave the film an average grade of "A" on an A+ to F scale.

Awards

International Film Music Critics Award (IFMCA) 2005 

Teen Choice Awards 2005

References

External links

 
 
 
 
 

2005 films
2000s sports comedy-drama films
Films about horses
Films set on farms
Films set in Kentucky
Films about animals playing sports
Films about animals
American sports comedy-drama films
American horse racing films
Films shot in South Africa
Fictional zebras
Warner Bros. films
Alcon Entertainment films
Summit Entertainment films
Films scored by Mark Isham
2005 comedy films
2005 drama films
Films about women's sports
2000s English-language films
Films directed by Frederik Du Chau
2000s American films